Haym Salomon Nursing Home
 is a long-term nursing home and short-term medical rehabilitation facility located in Bensonhurst, Brooklyn.

History
It was named after Haym Salomon (17401785), a Jewish businessman and political financial broker who was involved in the American Revolutionary War. The facility, also known as Haym Salomon Home for Nursing and Rehabilitation, moved from an earlier location. In 1982 The New York Times described it as bankrupt. In the following decades they continued operation, even through the COVID-19 pandemic.

See also
 Sephardic Home for the Aged

References

Nursing homes in the United States
Bensonhurst, Brooklyn